Sir Ronald Michael Sanders   (born 26 January 1948) is an Antiguan Barbudan diplomat, academic former broadcast-journalist, and the current Ambassador Extraordinary and Plenipotentiary to the United States and to the Organization of American States since 2015. He is also the non-resident High Commissioner to Canada since 2017. He served twice as Antigua's High Commissioner to the United Kingdom (1983–1987, 1996–2004) as well as ambassador and negotiator to the World Trade Organization (WTO) (1997–2004). He was a member and Rapporteur of the Commonwealth Eminent Persons Group (2010–2011) that produced a seminal report entitled, A Commonwealth of the People: Time for Urgent Reform that laid out a plan of action to make the Commonwealth effective and relevant. He was Antigua and Barbuda's nominee to be secretary general of the Commonwealth at the election held at the 2015 Commonwealth Heads of Government Meeting. He is a senior research fellow at the Institute of Commonwealth Studies, University of London, and is a speaker at conventions and conferences on global financial services issues and on Caribbean states in the political-economy of the Americas and the Commonwealth.

Background
Sanders was born in Guyana. He has a master's degree in international relations from the University of Sussex and attended Boston University. He was also a visiting fellow at Queen Elizabeth House, Oxford University (1987–1988).

Sanders was a successful broadcaster in the 1970s, becoming general manager of the Guyana Broadcasting Service in 1973 at the early age of 25. He went on to be an executive at Caribbean Broadcasting Union, and Caribbean News Agency. He has served as a board member of UNESCO and as chairman of the Caribbean Financial Action Task Force against drug trafficking and money laundering. Since 2010, he has been a member of "The Friends of the Democratic Charter", a group of leading personalities from Latin America and the Caribbean, established by former US President Jimmy Carter, to oversee compliance with the Inter-American Democratic Charter.

Between 2002–2004, Sanders was Antigua and Barbuda's chief foreign affairs representative.  He holds the distinction of being the only representative of a small state to lead a successful trade dispute at the World Trade Organization.

In 2004, a World Trade Organization arbitration panel found in favour of the arguments he led as Antigua and Barbuda's ambassador in a case against the United States of America over cross-border access for Internet gaming and a violation of the General Agreement on Trade in Services.

Sanders has been a board member of UNESCO. He is a senior research fellow at the Institute of Commonwealth Studies, University of London and a senior fellow at Massey College, University of Toronto on leave. He has also served as an international business consultant and writer.

Commonwealth and the OAS
Sanders was perceived to be the frontrunner to become the 6th Commonwealth Secretary-General and was backed by the majority of CARICOM nations heading into a meeting of Commonwealth Heads of Government in Malta in November 2015.  There were three candidates: Sanders, proposed by Antigua and Barbuda with the support of the majority of Caribbean countries; Baroness Patricia Scotland, a member of the British House of Lords and a former British government minister, nominated by Dominica where she was born and backed by the British government; and Mmasekgoa Masire-Mwamba, of Botswana, a former Deputy Secretary-General of the Commonwealth Secretariat.

Sanders' campaign for the post was torpedoed the day before the election by a story in British newspaper The Daily Telegraph that had been touted to other media but rejected by them.  The story was based on an eleven-year old, unsubstantiated allegation made in an unpublished report by the political party then in office in Antigua and Barbuda. At the time, the allegations were roundly condemned by lawyers in the region.  The story also paid scant attention to a published letter in June 2015 by the police commissioner of Antigua and Barbuda saying that the police had no interest in Sir Ronald and that Antigua's director of public prosecutions had ruled that the allegations against him were “seriously defective” and “disclose no offence”.  In the end, both Sanders and Masire-Mwamba lost to Patricia Scotland.

Sanders went on to continue his diplomatic career as Antigua and Barbuda's ambassador to the United States and the Organization of American States (OAS).  From January to April 2016, he served a highly praised period as Chair of the Permanent Council of the 34-member Organisation of American States. The Permanent Council is the decision-making body responsible for the affairs of the OAS between meetings of foreign ministers of the member countries. In January/February 2016, he also led a Special OAS mission to Haiti that helped to solve a constitutional and political impasse that threatened violence and political disruption.

In April 2021, Sanders was appointed Vice Chair of the Permanent Council for a three-month term. After the death of Chair Elisa Ruiz Díaz, he served as Chair for the remainder of her term.

Family
Sir Ronald Sanders is the younger brother of the late Joseph Sanders LLM (Lond.) LLB (UWO) Barrister (England) International and Constitutional Lawyer, a former Deputy Permanent Representative to the United Nations and Deputy High Commissioner to Canada for Guyana. Both his parents are deceased and he has three sisters.  He is married to Susan, the eldest daughter of former Commonwealth Secretary-General Sir Shridath Ramphal and Lady Ramphal.

Controversy

Sanders has been linked to illegal payments paid to an HSBC account in the Isle of Man, along with those of fellow Antiguan politician Asot Michael. Although Sanders has denied wrongdoing, he has been unable to account the origin of the $1.4 million deposits by Israeli businessman Bruce Rappaport who has ties to Antigua and Barbuda. The scandal is believed to have scuppered his aspirations to lead the Commonwealth.

Awards and works 
He was awarded a British knighthood in 2002 by the Queen as  Knight Commander of the Most Distinguished Order of St Michael and St George (KCMG) and also has an Antiguan knighthood as Knight Commander of the Most Distinguished Order of the Nation (KCN).

His academic writings have been published extensively, particularly on the Commonwealth and small states. Additionally, since 2004 he has written a weekly column, published in leading Caribbean newspapers and by Internet news portals, on the political economy of the Caribbean and on Commonwealth and Latin American matters.

References

Living people
1948 births
Knights Commander of the Order of St Michael and St George
Members of the Order of Australia
Antigua and Barbuda diplomats
Antigua and Barbuda businesspeople
Alumni of the University of Sussex
Boston University alumni
Guyanese emigrants to Antigua and Barbuda
Recipients of the Order of the Nation (Antigua and Barbuda)
Ambassadors of Antigua and Barbuda to the United States
High Commissioners of Antigua and Barbuda to the United Kingdom
Permanent Representatives to the World Trade Organization
High Commissioners of Antigua and Barbuda to Canada